The 2010–11 Cleveland State Vikings men's basketball team represented Cleveland State University in the 2010–11 NCAA Division I men's basketball season. Their head coach was Gary Waters. The Vikings played their home games at the Wolstein Center and are members of the Horizon League. It was the 80th season of Cleveland State basketball. They finished the season 27–9, 13–5 in Horizon League play to share the regular season conference title with Butler and Milwaukee. They lost in the semifinals of the 2011 Horizon League men's basketball tournament to Butler. They were invited to the 2011 National Invitation Tournament where they defeated Vermont before falling to the College of Charleston in the second round.

Preseason
The preseason Horizon League Coaches' Poll picked the Vikings to finish third. Norris Cole was named to the preseason all-Horizon League 1st team.

Regular season
On November 29, 2010 Cleveland State received their first point in the AP Top 25 poll for the season, that had them 41st. The lone point came from Steve Deshazo of The Free Lance-Star. The game time of the February 5 game against Butler was changed from 2:00 p.m. to 12:00 p.m. to accommodate a broadcast on ESPN2. The attendance at the Butler @ Cleveland State game on February 5 was 8,490. That is the 6th largest home attendance ever for a Cleveland State basketball game.

Roster

Schedule

|-
!colspan=9| Exhibition

|-
!colspan=9| Regular season

|-
!colspan=9| Horizon League tournament

|-
!colspan=9| 2011 National Invitation Tournament

Rankings

References

Cleveland State Vikings Men's
Cleveland State Vikings men's basketball seasons
Cleveland State
Cleveland State Vikings men's basketball
Cleveland State Vikings men's basketball